Cerro Peñas Azules is a peak in Argentina with an elevation of  metres. Peñas Azules is within the following mountain ranges: Argentine Andes and Puna de Atacama. It is located within the territory of the Argentinean province of La Rioja. Its slopes are within the administrative boundaries of the Argentinean city of Vinchina.

First Ascent 
Peñas Azules was first climbed by Vicente Cichitti, Jorge Guajardo and Hermann Klark (Argentina) March 11th 1955.

Elevation 
Data from available digital elevation model ASTER yields 5947 metres. The height of the nearest key col is 5187 meters, leading to a topographic prominence of 783 meters. Peñas Azules is considered a Mountain Subgroup according to the Dominance System  and its dominance is 13.12%. Its parent peak is Pissis and the Topographic isolation is 30 kilometers.

References

External links 

 Elevation information about Peñas Azules

 Weather Forecast at Peñas Azules

Five-thousanders of the Andes